Eva Romanová (born 27 January 1946) is a Czech former figure skater who represented Czechoslovakia in pair skating and ice dancing with her brother Pavel Roman. As ice dancers, they became four-time World champions (1962–65) and two-time European champions (1964–65).

Career

The Romans started their competitive careers in pair skating rather than ice dance, placing third at the Czechoslovak Championships in 1957 and second in 1958 and 1959. They won the national ice dancing title in 1959, the first year that discipline was competed in Czechoslovakia. They competed in both disciplines at the 1959 European Championships, placing 7th in dance and 12th in pairs. After that they focused on ice dancing.

The siblings won their first world title at the 1962 World Championships in their home city of Prague, defeating their greatest rivals, Christian and Jean Paul Guhel of France. Eva was 16 years old and Pavel was 19. One year later, they won the silver medal at the 1963 European Championships, behind Linda Shearman / Michael Phillips. After this competition they won every event they entered, winning the European title in 1964 and 1965, and World titles from 1962–65. Ice dancing was not yet an Olympic sport.

After retiring from competition they skated in the professional revue Holiday on Ice.

Personal life

Romanová married Jackie Graham. After living in the US they returned to Great Britain. In 2000 they moved to Czech Republic due to Eva's mother's poor health. In 2006, after the death of Eva's mother they resettled in the UK where Graham died. Eva still lives in Great Britain.

Results

Pairs with Roman

Ice dance with Roman

References

Czechoslovak female ice dancers
Czechoslovak female pair skaters
1946 births
Living people
Sportspeople from Olomouc
World Figure Skating Championships medalists
European Figure Skating Championships medalists
Articles containing video clips